Jeongye Daewongun (Hangul: 전계대원군; Hanja: 全溪大院君; 21 March 1785 – 2 November 1841) was a member of the Korean Joseon dynasty as the biological father of King Cheoljong of Joseon. His personal name was Yi Gwang (hangul: 이광; hanja: 李㼅), but he was also known as Kwae-deuk (hangul: 쾌득; hanja: 快得) or Hae-dong (hangul: 해동; hanja: 海東).

Early life 
Yi Gwang was born on March 21, 1785, in Ganghwa-do. His birth name was Kwae-deuk, which later changed to Hae-dong and after some years to Gwang.

He was one of several illegitimate sons of Prince Euneon and the second of two sons of Lady Yi of the Jeonsan Yi clan. His older full-brother had an early death.

His legitimate eldest half-brother was Prince Sanggye, also known as Crown Prince Wanpung, who was an adopted son of Jeongjo of Joseon and heir to the throne for a short time, in 1779.

His father, Prince Euneon, was an illegitimate son of Crown Prince Sado by his concubine, Royal Noble Consort Suk of the Buan Im clan; Sado himself was an illegitimate son of King Yeongjo of Joseon. This made Jeongye the half-nephew of King Jeongjo, but during his life, he did not receive the treatment of a member of the Royal Family.

In 1801, Prince Euneon was executed after his legitimate wife, Princess Consort Sangsan of the Jincheon Song clan and his daughter-in-law, Princess Consort Shin of the Pyeongsan Shin clan (the wife of Prince Sanggye), had been baptized into the Roman Catholic Church. The Joseon Dynasty's state religion was Neo-Confucianism, so Princess Sangsan, Prince Euneon and Princess Shin were executed for treason.

Some of Prince Euneon's sons, including Yi Gwang, were exiled on Ganghwa Island where they lived as poor farmers, but in 1822 the family received a special pardon from King Sunjo.

On November 2, 1841, Grand Internal Prince Jeongye died at his home in Gyeonghaeng, Hanseong, at the age of 56. The cause of death is unknown.

After death 

In August 1841, the Noron faction plotted a coup d'état in order to crown Yi Won-gyeong, Yi Gwang's eldest child and only legitimate son as the new King. However, the plot was detected, which led to the execution of Yi Won-gyeong. The sole survivors were Yi Gwang's two illegitimate sons, Yi Gyeong-eung and Yi Won-beom, who were again exiled to Ganghwa-do.

In 1849, his son, Yi Won-beom, born to a concubine named Lady Yeom, became the new monarch of Joseon as King Cheoljong. The title Daewongun was posthumously conferred on Prince Jeongye, making his full name Jeongye Daewongun.

His tomb was originally in Jingwan, Eunpyeong-gu, Seoul, northwest of his father, Prince Euneon's grave, but it was moved to Yeoju, and in August 1851, to Seondan-ri, Pocheon-eup, near Wangbang Mountain.

Family
Father: Yi In, Prince Euneon (29 May 1754 – 30 June 1801) (이인 은언군)
Grandfather: King Jangjo of Joseon (13 February 1735 – 12 July 1762) (조선 장조)
Grandmother: Royal Noble Consort Suk of the Buan Im clan (? - 1773) (숙빈 임씨)
Mother: Princess Consort Jeonsan of the Jeonju Yi clan (19 December 1764 – 4 June 1819) (전산군부인 전주 이씨)
Consorts and their Respective Issue:
Grand Internal Princess Consort Wanyang of the Jeonju Choi clan (19 February 1804 - 19 February 1840) (완양부대부인 전주 최씨)
 Yi Wongyeong, Prince Hoepyeong (11 September 1827 – 6 September 1844) (회평군 이명), first son
Grand Internal Princess Consort Yongseong of the Yongdam Yeom clan (20 July 1793 - March 1834) (용성부대부인 용담 염씨)
 King Cheoljong (25 July 1831 – 16 January 1864), third son
Lady Yi (이씨)
 Yi Gyeongeung, Prince Yeongpyeong (20 July 1828 – 1 February 1902) (영평군 이경응), second son

Ancestry

References

Further reading

Cummings, Bruce.  (1997).  Korea's Place in the Sun: A Modern History. New York.  
 완양부대부인 묘비 탁본 

19th-century Korean people
1785 births
1841 deaths
House of Yi
Korean princes
People executed by starvation